Euthyatira pryeri is a moth in the family Drepanidae. It is found in Japan and possibly Shaanxi, China.

References

Moths described in 1881
Thyatirinae